Lenin and Philosophy and Other Essays is a collection of essays, written by the Marxist philosopher Louis Althusser, published in 1971. A similar edition in French is Lénine et la philosophie suivi de Marx et Lénine devant Hegel (Paris, 1972).

Both editions consist of Althusser’s lecture at the Société française de philosophie ‘Lenin and Philosophy’ as well as of Althusser’s essay ‘Lenin before Hegel’ (written in 1968; first published [in French]: 1970).

A third essay within the French edition is Sur la rapport de Marx à Hegel (About the relationship of Marx to Hegel) (written in 1969; first published [in German]: 1970). This essay is not part of the English edition.

Rather the English edition additionally consists of a foreword, written by Althusser himself, and six other works of Althusser, which are not part of the French edition. Among these six works is Althusser’s famous essay ‘Ideology and Ideological State Apparatuses’.

Most recent English editions 

Louis Althusser, Lenin and Philosophy and Other Essays. [Newly] introduced by Fredric Jameson. Translated from the French by Ben Brewster (Dewey classification: 335.43)

 Monthly Review Press: New York, 2001 ( [pbk.]; 1-583-67038-6 [cloth]); XVII + 173 pages; Table of Content)
 Aakar Books: Delhi, 2006 (XVII + 173 pages; OCLC: 838361487)

External links 

 Lenin and Philosophy and Other Essays
 Lenin and Philosophy and Other Essays
 Wikidata items regarding the French editions: 1968 (journal article), 1969 (book), 1972 (article within enlarged book)

References 

1969 non-fiction books
1972 non-fiction books
French non-fiction books
Marxist works
Philosophy books
Works by Louis Althusser